Going Shopping is a 2005 American romance film directed by Henry Jaglom and stars Victoria Foyt, Rob Morrow, Lee Grant, Mae Whitman, Juliet Landau and Hilary Shepard.

Plot

Cast
 Victoria Foyt as Holly Gilmore
 Rob Morrow as Miles
 Lee Grant as Winnie
 Juliet Landau as Isabella
 Mae Whitman as Coco
 Bruce Davison as Adam
 Jennifer Grant as Quinn
 Cynthia Sikes as Lisa
 Martha Gehman as Melanie
 Pamela Bellwood as Landlady
 Robert Romanus as Jimmy
 Hilary Shepard as Shopper

External links
 

2005 films
2005 romantic drama films
American romantic drama films
Films directed by Henry Jaglom
Films shot in Los Angeles
2000s English-language films
2000s American films